King's Highway 51, commonly referred to as Highway 51, was a provincially maintained highway in the Canadian province of Ontario that connected Highway 3 in Eatonville with Rondeau Provincial Park. An earlier designation existed south of Orangeville, connecting Highway 24 with Highway 10 in Caledon Village. This iteration was assumed in 1938, but later renumbered as Highway24 In 1961. The more recent incarnation of the route number was assumed in 1970, but then decommissioned in 1997 and transferred to what is now the city of Chatham-Kent.

Route description 
Highway 51 was a short connector road that served to link Highway 3 to Rondeau Provincial Park. At its southern terminus, the highway began at the entrance gates to the provincial park, proceeding northeast through a small community of recreational cottages. The highway exited the park and turned north onto what is now Chatham–Kent Road 15. From here the highway progressed straight north to Highway 3, passing through the community of New Scotland along the way.
Trees continue to line both sides of this section of the highway, with farmland sprawling out beyond that.

History 
In 1961, the section of Highway24 between Highway51 and Orangeville was renumbered as Highway 136; Highway51 was renumbered as Highway24 and the latter signed concurrently with Highway10 north to Orangeville.
On April9, 1970, the road from Eatonville to Rondeau Provincial Park was designated as Highway51.
This iteration of the route remained unaltered until April1, 1997, when it was transferred to Kent County, now the City of Chatham–Kent.
It was subsequently designated as Chatham–Kent Road15.

Major intersections

References 

051